Circus Royale is an Australian Circus owned and operated by Australia's youngest Circus owner, Damian Syred. The show is a traditional type Circus with the traditional acts such as areal acts and juggling. As well as some horses and ducks.

References

Links
http://circusfans.com.au/

Australian circuses
1971 establishments in Australia
Entertainment companies established in 1971
Performing groups established in 1971